Rim Jihoon (born September 28, 1980) is a visiting professor of management practice in the Department of Management and Organizations at New York University Stern School of Business. He is a former CEO of Kakao (KRX:035720), a South Korean technology company known for its mobile messenger Kakao Talk. His appointment as CEO at 34 years of age made him the youngest CEO among South Korea's top 500 companies.

Rim earned a bachelor's degree in industrial engineering from the Korea Advanced Institute of Science and Technology (KAIST) and received the Industrial Engineering Best Graduate Award. He began his career at Accenture, then moved on to Naver, South Korea's most-visited online search engine, before joining Boston Consulting Group and later, Softbank Ventures in Seoul. 

Prior to Kakao, Rim founded K Cube Ventures in 2012, which became one of the most reputable VC firms in South Korea. The inaugural $10M fund returned more than $1B+, being recognized as the best performed (100X+, 10-year IRR ~70%) VC fund ever in South Korea. 

The Asian Venture Capital Journal published a profile on professor Rim in October 2020.

Kakao 
During his tenure as CEO of Kakao, Rim successfully expanded the company's business into finance, content, mobility and invested heavily in artificial intelligence. The company's company's revenue and operating income doubled during his two-and-a-half-year term. 

Acquisition of $1.6B LOEN Entertainment was evaluated as one of the best M&As in South Korea's tech industry.

He received numerous accolades for his leadership and performance, including being ranked No.1 in "2017 Korea’s Best CEO” survey and being selected as "2018 Korea’s Top 10 Hero" by the Maeil Broadcasting Network. In academia, he received the "AIS Leadership Award", a prize presented by the Association for Information Systems to one person a year who demonstrated exemplary leadership and innovation.

K Cube Ventures 
Rim founded K Cube Ventures, an early stage venture capital in Korea in 2012. The firm quickly grew and became reputable enough to be ranked the 7th by CB Insights under the category of "2017, The most active 'corporate venture capital" in the world (K Cube Ventures was acquired by Kakao in 2015 and became a CVC.) The inaugural $10M fund returned more than $1B+, being recognized as the best performed (100X+, 10-year IRR ~70%) VC fund evern in South Korea.

NYU Stern School of Business 
Professor Rim joined NYU Stern School of Business in 2019 and teaches two of the most highly regarded MBA elective courses: Managing a High-Tech Company and Founding a Startup. He also teaches at TRIUM, a global EMBA run by NYU Stern, London School of Economics, and HEC Paris.

Awards 

 The AIS Leadership Excellence Award: The Association for Information Systems Leadership Excellence Award is presented annually to an individual who has demonstrated exemplary leadership and innovation in the use and development of information systems.
 2017 Korea's Best CEO: Rim was selected as Best CEO by Insight Korea. This was based on a survey done by a South Korean research group and votes cast by university/college students in South Korea. He got 12.6% of total votes, preceding JY Lee, vice chairman of Samsung Group who got 6.8% and ranked second.
 Korea's Top 10 Hero: Every year,  South Korea's Maeil Broadcasting Network (MBN) selects and announces "Korea's Top 10 Heros", a total of ten people who are recognized as top achievers in their field (acting, sport, business, government, etc.).

Talks (videos) 

 Harvard Undergraduate KORUM, Fireside Chat, Spring 2021 
NYU Stern, Fubon Center's Fireside Chat, Fall 2020 
Podcast Stern Chats: The Youngest Major CEO in South Korea, Fall 2020 
Harvard Asia Business Conference, HBS, Keynote, 2020 Spring 
 NYU Stern Digital Innovation Conference, Platform Strategy, Plenary Talk, 2019 Fall
 The Korea Society (think tank in NYC), Fireside Chat, 2019 Fall
 International Conference on Information Systems, Keynote, 2017: AIS Leadership Excellence Award - Kakao
 Wall Street Journal, DLive, Plenary Talk, 2017:  Future of Messenger: Kakao & Hike

References

External links
Official website

1980 births
Living people
South Korean businesspeople
Kakao
KAIST alumni
People from Seoul